The sixth season of the sitcom Full House originally aired on ABC between September 22, 1992, and May 18, 1993.

Plot
In season six, Danny proposes to Vicky as she gladly accepts. Jesse and Joey both quit their daytime jobs and become radio hosts on the show "Rush Hour Renegades," which eventually turns into a success. Rebecca also has to deal with Jesse's recent climb to stardom as he tours Japan with his band for the first half of the season, in the second half of the season, he returns to high school to get his diploma. D. J. is a sophomore in high school and gets her first real boyfriend, Steve Hale, who begins his senior year in high school; Stephanie is in fifth grade; Michelle starts first grade.

Main cast 

 John Stamos as Jesse Katsopolis
 Bob Saget as Danny Tanner 
 Dave Coulier as Joey Gladstone
 Candace Cameron as D. J. Tanner
 Jodie Sweetin as Stephanie Tanner
 Mary-Kate and Ashley Olsen as Michelle Tanner
 Lori Loughlin as Rebecca Donaldson-Katsopolis
 Andrea Barber as Kimmy Gibbler
 Scott Weinger as Steve Hale

Episodes

See also 
 List of Full House episodes

References 

General references 
 
 

1992 American television seasons
1993 American television seasons
6